Solomon Olumuyiwa Kayode Williams commonly known as Kayode Williams is a Nigerian minister, prison reform activist and ex-convict. He was among the gang of Dr. Ishola which included Mighty Joe.

Life 
Willams was among the gang of Ishola Oyenusi aka Dr. Ishola. He was arrested alongside Ishola in 1971. He converted to Christianity while serving a 10-year jail term. Afterwards, he became an activist for prison reform in Nigeria.

References 

Nigerian evangelists
Nigerian activists